Butterfly gardening is a way to create, improve, and maintain habitat for lepidopterans including butterflies, skippers, and moths. Butterflies have four distinct life stages—egg, larva, chrysalis, and adult. In order to support and sustain butterfly populations, an ideal butterfly garden contains habitat for each life stage.

Butterfly larvae, with some exceptions such as the carnivorous harvester (Feniseca tarquinius), consume plant matter and can be generalists or specialists. While butterflies like the painted lady (Vanessa cardui) are known to consume over 200 plants as caterpillars, other species like the monarch (Danaus plexippus), and the regal fritillary (Speyeria idalia) only consume plants in one genus, milkweed and violets, respectively. 

As adults, butterflies feed mainly on nectar, but they have also evolved to consume rotting fruit, tree sap, and even carrion. Supporting nectarivorous adult butterflies involves planting nectar plants of different heights, color, and bloom times. Butterfly bait stations can easily be made to provide a food source for species that prefer fruit and sap. In addition to food sources, wind breaks in the form of trees and shrubs shelter butterflies and can provide larval food and overwintering grounds. "Puddling" is a behavior generally done by male butterflies in which they gather to drink nutrients and water and incorporating a puddling ground for butterflies will enhance a butterfly garden. While butterflies are not the only pollinator, creating butterfly habitat also creates habitat for bees, beetles, flies, and other pollinators

Reasoning 

Butterfly gardening provides a recreational activity to view butterflies interacting with the environment. Besides anthropocentric values of butterfly gardening, creating habitat reduces the impacts of habitat fragmentation and degradation. Habitat degradation is a multivariate issue; development, increased use of pesticides and herbicides, woody encroachment, and non-native plants are contributing factors to the decline in butterfly and pollinator habitat. Pollination is one ecological service butterflies provide; about 90% of flowering plants and 35% of crops rely on animal pollination. Butterfly gardens and monarch waystations, even in developed urban areas, provide habitat that increases the diversity of butterflies and other pollinators, including bees, flies, and beetles.

Ground-truthing 

Before buying plants and digging into the soil, "ground-truthing" is a necessary first step, Ground-truthing involves surveying a property in order to assess the current resources available. Some aspects to keep in mind are the following:

 south-facing slopes
 natural wind breaks
 present plant species
 present butterfly species

Butterflies are ectothermic and rely on solar radiation for their metabolism. South-facing slopes are an ideal location for a butterfly garden, as they provide the most solar radiation (in the Northern Hemisphere; the opposite is true in the Southern Hemisphere). Shrubs and trees provide wind breaks for butterflies, and can also be host plants, such as spicebush (Lindera benzoin) or pawpaw (Asimina triloba)

Plants 

The types of plants used in a butterfly garden will determine which species of butterflies will visit a garden. Lepidoptera societies and the Department of Natural Resources often provide state and county distribution maps of local butterflies. There are lists of butterfly species and their host plants which are informative to the plant species needed in the garden (see: Larval food plants of Lepidoptera). While non-native plants do provide flora resources later in the season, they can have an overall negative effect on butterflies and other pollinators. Therefore, it is often recommended to use native plants.

Depending on the zone, some butterfly attracting plants include: purple cone flower (Echinacea purpurea), buttonbush (Cephalanthus occidentalis), yellow cone flowers, sunflowers, marigolds, poppies, cosmos, salvias, some lilies, asters, coreopsis, daisies, Joe Pye Weed (Eutrochium), verbenas, Blue Mist Shrub (Caryopteris × clandonensis), lantanas, liastris, milkweed (especially for the monarch butterfly, whose caterpillars feed solely on this plant), zinnias, pentas, porterweeds, and others. Avoid cultivars of plants that have "double flowers" as their reproductive parts have been converted into extra petals and therefore do not produce floral rewards for butterflies and other pollinators. Care should also be taken to research a species to assure that it is not invasive in a given region.

Buddleja davidii, which is often called "butterfly-bush", attracts many butterflies. As it originated in China, it is presently planted in many parts of the world in which it is non-native. In such settings, the plant feeds many native butterflies and other adult pollinators, but not many of their larvae. As B. davidii is invasive in some areas, plantings of the species are controversial. To prevent seeding and to promote further flowering, its blossoms need to be removed ("deadheaded") as soon as soon as they are spent.

A number of Buddleja cultivars have become available that have a variety of sizes and blossom colors. University studies have suggested that nectaring butterflies have greater preferences for some of these than for others, with Lo & Behold 'Blue Chip' and 'Pink Delight' heading a list of eleven.

Some Buddleja cultivars are either sterile or produce less than 2% viable seed (see Non-invasive Buddleja cultivars). The state of Oregon, which designates B. davidii as a "noxious weed" and initially prohibited entry, transport, purchase, sale or propagation of all of its varieties, amended its quarantine in 2009 to permit those cultivars when approved or when proven to be interspecific hybrids. Monarch Watch recommends planting only male-sterile "Flutterby" cultivars.

It is important to avoid purchasing plants and seeds treated with insecticides such as neonicotinoids. Although not yet conclusive, there is increasing evidence that neonicotinoids can have negative effects on pollinating insects, including butterflies.

Puddling 

"Puddling" refers to the behavior of male butterflies congregating on wet soil, dung, and carrion to feed on nutrients, specifically sodium. Nectar is low in sodium, and sodium is a limiting nutrient for Lepidoptera. Male butterflies are able to transfer sodium to females during copulation. The sodium is passed onto offspring and increases reproductive success. To create a simple puddling habitat, fill a shallow dish (like a draining tray for a pot) with wet sand. To increase the nutrients, mix compost with the sand. Add footholds for butterflies by adding different sized rocks.

Baiting 
There are numerous recipes for creating butterfly bait, but they have common ingredients. Fermentation is the key to a good bait, as it mimics the fermentation of rotting fruit and sap in the natural environment. Recipes include blending rotten fruit (i.e. bananas) with beer, maple syrup, molasses, or sugar. Often yeast is added as well to the mixture and left to ferment for a week. Urine is also known to attract fruit-feeding butterflies. The bait can be laid on stumps, rocks, and tree limbs.

Problems 

There are diseases that afflict butterflies, such as bacteria in the genus Pseudomonas, the nuclear polyhedrosis virus, and Ophryocystis elektroscirrha, which only infects queen butterflies and monarch butterflies.

In the absence of pesticides, aphids and true bugs may infest plants. Some gardeners may wish to release ladybugs (ladybirds) and other biological pest control agents that do not harm butterflies in order to control aphids. However, the release of ladybugs is not a good idea in places such as the United States where the species that is released is generally the invasive Chinese ladybug.

An alternative to this is to wait for local predatory insects to find the aphids. One technique some use to quicken this process if the infestation is particularly high is to spray the bushes with a mix of sugar and water, simulating aphid honeydew. This is known to attract lacewings whose larva eat aphids.

Another method of control is by spraying the plants with water, or rinsing plants with a mild dish detergent/water solution (although caterpillars should be relocated before suds are applied). Scented detergents are fine; those containing OxiClean should be avoided. The aphids will turn black within a day, and eventually fall off. One last technique is to plant a variety of different flowers, including ones that attract hoverflies and parasitic Braconid wasps, whose larvae kill pest species. Still, it is not advisable to kill all aphids, just to control them so that they are not detrimental to plants. Aphids still play a role in the environment by providing food for predators. There are even some caterpillars such as the harvester which only eat certain aphid species instead of plants.

With small home butterfly gardens, it is common for the larvae to exhaust the food source before metamorphosis occurs. Gardeners of monarch butterflies can replace the expended milkweed with a slice of pumpkin or cucumber, which can serve as a substitute source of food for monarch caterpillars in their final (fifth)  instar. Planting multiple plants in clumps can help lower the chances of running out of leaves.

Monarch Watch provides information on rearing monarchs and their host plants. Efforts to restore falling butterfly populations by establishing butterfly gardens and migrating monarch "waystations" require particular attention to the target species' food preferences and population cycles, as well to the conditions needed to propagate and maintain their food plants.

For instance, it has been suggested that the commonly sold, popular Brazilian (or tropical) milkweed (Asclepias curassavica) is problematic; although it successfully beckons the butterflies to lay their eggs, with gardeners often finding a veritable caterpillar “nursery” on their plants, the particular species in question is native to South America. This can be potentially altering to the butterflies’ natural migratory instinct, to fly and breed south of the United States; they become “spoiled” on garden tropical milkweed, stay where they are, and potentially avoid breeding. 

Awareness of different milkweed species is of vital importance. In the Washington, D.C. area (and elsewhere in the northeastern United States), monarch butterflies prefer to reproduce on common milkweed (Asclepias syriaca), especially when its foliage is soft and fresh.  As monarch reproduction in that area peaks in late summer, when most A. syriaca leaves are old and tough, the plant needs to be cut back in June, July, or August, to assure that it will be regrowing rapidly, when monarch reproduction reaches its peak. Similar conditions exist for showy milkweed (A. speciosa) in Michigan and for green antelopehorn milkweed (A. viridis) where it grows in the southern Great Plains and the western United States. In addition, the seeds of A. syriaca and some other milkweeds need periods of cold treatment (cold stratification) before they will germinate.

To protect seeds from washing away during heavy rains and from seed–eating birds, one can cover the seeds with a light fabric or with an  layer of straw mulch.  However, mulch acts as an insulator. Thicker layers of mulch can prevent seeds from germinating if they prevent soil temperatures from rising enough when winter ends. Further, few seedlings can push through a thick layer of mulch.

Many species of milkweed contain toxic cardiac glycosides (cardenolides). Monarch caterpillars deter predators by incorporating these chemical compounds into their bodies, where the toxins remain throughout the insect's lifetime. Although monarch caterpillars will feed on butterfly weed (Asclepias tuberosa), the plant contains only low levels of cardiac glycosides. This may make A. tuberosa unattractive to egg-laying monarchs. Some other milkweeds have similar characteristics.

In addition to its low levels of cardiac glycosides, A. tuberosa has rough leaves, which are also unattractive to egg-laying monarchs. As a result of these factors, reproducing monarchs do not typically use A. tuberosa as a host plant for their offspring. Although the plant's colorful flowers provide nectar for many adult butterflies, A. tuberosa may therefore be less suitable for use in butterfly gardens than are other milkweed species.

Breeding monarchs prefer to lay eggs on swamp milkweed (A. incarnata). A. incarnata is therefore often planted in butterfly gardens and "Monarch Waystations" to help sustain the butterfly's populations.

However, A. incarnata is an early successional plant that usually grows at the margins of wetlands and in seasonally flooded areas. The plant is slow to spread via seeds, does not spread by runners and tends to disappear as vegetative densities increase and habitats dry out. Although A. incarnata plants can survive for up to 20 years, most live only two-five years in gardens. The species is not shade-tolerant and is not a good vegetative competitor.

Butterflies and moths at typical nectar-foodplants

Books

See also 

 Butterfly house (conservatory)
 Category: Lists of Lepidoptera by food
 Category: Lists of butterflies

Notes

References

External links 
 Plants To Attract Butterflies
 Butterfly Gardening Habitat Program, NABA
 Xerces Society for Invertebrate Conservation

 
Types of garden
Butterflies
Lepidoptera and humans
Sustainable gardening
Organic gardening